Gyaidar (Chinese: 格达乡; pinyin: Gédá Xiāng) is a town and township in Damxung County in the Lhasa Prefecture of Tibet, China. The township was affected by the February 5th Damxung earthquake in February 2009. Herdsmen of 151 households in Yangyi village, in Gyaidar Township had to evacuate their homes.

References

Populated places in Lhasa (prefecture-level city)
Township-level divisions of Tibet
Damxung County